Cameron Lochiel Murray (born 21 March 1995) is a semi-professional footballer who plays as a midfielder for National League club Weymouth. He started his senior career with York City in 2013.

Club career
Murray was born in Halifax, West Yorkshire and attended Brighouse High School. He played in the youth team of Leeds United aged six to nine and Bradford City aged 10 to 15. Murray moved to Spain on a scholarship in September 2011, before returning to England in May 2012 after fracturing his clavicle  He subsequently joined York City's youth team. He made his first-team debut at the age of 18 as a 75th-minute substitute for Tom Platt in York's 3–0 home defeat to Rotherham United in the second round of the Football League Trophy on 8 October 2013. Murray signed a one-and-a-half-year professional contract with York in January 2014. He joined Northern Premier League Premier Division club Frickley Athletic on 19 December on a one-month loan and made one start before returning to York on 20 January 2015.

Murray joined Scarborough Athletic of the Northern Premier League Division One North on 5 February 2015 after having his contract with York cancelled by mutual consent. He signed for National League North club F.C. United of Manchester on 7 August after impressing on trial during the summer. He signed for their divisional rivals Stalybridge Celtic in January 2016. Murray returned to former club Scarborough Athletic in October. He signed for Dorchester Town on 9 August 2018, having played with the club since the pre-season.

Murray signed for Weymouth on 14 January 2019.

International career
Despite being born in England, Murray was called up for a Scotland under-15 training camp in April 2010.

Career statistics

References

External links

1995 births
Living people
Footballers from Halifax, West Yorkshire
Footballers from West Yorkshire
English footballers
Association football midfielders
Leeds United F.C. players
Bradford City A.F.C. players
York City F.C. players
Frickley Athletic F.C. players
Scarborough Athletic F.C. players
F.C. United of Manchester players
Stalybridge Celtic F.C. players
Dorchester Town F.C. players
Weymouth F.C. players
Northern Premier League players
National League (English football) players
People educated at Brighouse High School